Madathattuvilai  is a village under  Villukuri Panchayat in Kanyakumari district, the southernmost district in the state of Tamil Nadu in India. 300+ residents of Madathattuvilai have donated their eyes in last one decade and making it a trailblazer among cities and towns across the country.

St. Sebastian Church and Festival

St.Sebastian Church situated right in the center of the village, is also an important social center that plays a very important role in the lives of the people in the village. St. Sebastian Church Festival lasts for ten days and draws crowds from surrounding areas for the music, drama and fireworks that add color to this religious event. The festival dates are based on the St. Sebastian Feast (20 January); i.e. 20 January is between the 3rd day to 8th day of the festival.

Eye Donation

 As many as 300+ people in the village have donated their eyes over the past 14 years turning Madathattuvilai into a trendsetter in creating awareness on eye donation. About 95% of those who die donate their eyes and 1,500 enrolled for eye donation, most of them were young.

Education

Madathattuvilai peoples are Highly educated. The literacy rate is 100%. At present the village has one teacher or lecturer or college professor in each household. The village produces many Teacher, Lecturer, lawyers, college professors, and government employees, including military and paramilitary service and State Administrative Service personnel.  The graduates are multiplied every year. For example Doctorate (both Arts and Science) candidates are approximately 25 in the village.

Education Institutes

 St.Sebastian Matriculation School
 St.Sebastian Computer Education
 St. Alocious Primary School 
 St. Lawrence Higher Secondary School ( which is one of the oldest high schools in the area)
 Mother Gnanamma Catholic College of Education
St.Sebastian Career Academy 
 Adline Matric Higher Secondary School

Culture and Religion

The village, being predominantly Roman Catholic and belong to the Nadar caste.

References

External links
Madathattuvilai Official Website

Villages in Kanyakumari district